The Golden Child is a 1986 American dark fantasy martial arts action comedy film directed by Michael Ritchie. The film stars Eddie Murphy as Chandler Jarrell, a Los Angeles social worker who is informed that he is "The Chosen One", and is destined to save "The Golden Child", a kidnapped Tibetan boy with mystical powers who is said to be the savior of all humankind. Alongside Murphy, the film's cast includes Charlotte Lewis and Charles Dance.

Rated PG-13,  Murphy's first film not to be rated R by the Motion Picture Association (MPA), The Golden Child was produced and distributed by Paramount Pictures and received a total gross of $79,817,937 at the United States domestic box office.

Plot
In a remote temple in Tibet, a young boy with mystical powers – the Golden Child – receives badges of station and demonstrates his power to the monks of the temple by reviving a dead eastern rosella, which becomes a constant companion and familiar. A mysterious man, Sardo Numspa, has his men break into the temple, slaughter the monks and abduct the boy.

A young woman, Kee Nang, watches a Los Angeles TV show in which social worker Chandler Jarrell talks about his latest case, a missing girl named Cheryll Mosley. Kee seeks him out and informs him of the kidnapping of the Golden Child and that he is the "chosen one" who would save the Child. Chandler does not take this seriously, even after a bird begins following him, and him seeing an astral projection of the Child. The next day, Cheryll Mosley is found dead near an abandoned house smeared with Tibetan graffiti and a pot full of blood-soaked oatmeal. Kee reveals to Chandler that this house was a holding place for the Child and introduces him to Doctor Hong, a mystic expert, and Kala (a creature half dragon, half woman, who remains hidden behind a screen).

Chandler and Kee track down a motorcycle gang, the Yellow Dragons, which Cheryll had joined, and Chinese restaurant owner Tommy Tong, a henchman of Numspa, to whom Cheryll had been "sold" for her blood, a way to make the Child vulnerable to earthly harm. However, Tong is killed by Numspa as a potential traitor. Numspa then communes with his master, a unseen powerful demon, who informs him of how to kill the child. Still not taking the case too seriously, Chandler is drawn by Numspa into a controlled dream, where he receives a burn mark on his arm. Numspa presents his demands: the Ajanti Dagger (a mystic weapon capable of killing the Child) in exchange for the boy. Chandler finally agrees to help, and he and Kee spend the night together.

Chandler and Kee travel to Tibet, where Chandler is swindled by an old amulet seller, later revealed as the High Priest of the temple where the dagger is kept hidden (and, subsequently, Kee's father). In order to obtain the knife, Chandler has to pass a test: an obstacle course in a bottomless cavern whilst carrying a glass of water without spilling a drop. With luck and wits, Chandler recovers the blade and even manages to bring it past customs into the United States.

That night, Numspa and his henchmen attack Chandler and Kee. The Ajanti Dagger is lost to the villains, and Kee takes a crossbow bolt meant for Chandler, dying in his arms while confessing her love for him. Doctor Hong and Kala offer him hope: as long as the sun shines upon Kee, the Child might be able to save her. With the help of the Child's familiar, Chandler locates Numspa's hideout, retrieves the dagger with the help of Til, one of Numspa's men converted to good by the Child, and frees the boy. When Chandler confronts Numspa, he reveals himself as a winged demon. Chandler and the Child escape, only to be trapped inside a warehouse. Chandler loses the dagger when the warehouse collapses, with Numspa buried under falling masonry.

Chandler and the Child head to Doctor Hong's shop, where Kee is being kept. As the two approach Kee's body, a badly injured but berserk Numspa attacks Chandler, but the amulet the Old Man sold Chandler protects him, then blasts the dagger from Numspa's hand. The Child uses his magic to place the dagger back into Chandler's hands, and Chandler stabs Numspa through the heart, destroying him. The Child then uses the last rays of sunlight and his powers to bring Kee back from the dead. The three later take a walk discussing the Child's return to Tibet.

Cast

J. L. Reate, the actor who played the "Golden Child", the male titular character, is actually female. Her full name is Jasmine Lauren Reate, and she was 7 when filming began. This was her one and only theatrical performance.

Production
Dennis Feldman, a professional photographer whose only writing credit was Just One of the Guys, wrote a script called The Rose of Tibet, which he planned as "a Raymond Chandler movie with supernatural elements." It attracted Hollywood's attention and after a bidding war Paramount Pictures purchased the script for $330,000. Feldman had intended it to be a detective story rather than a comedy and thought of  Mel Gibson for the lead role. John Carpenter was offered the chance to direct the film, but he preferred to instead work on Big Trouble in Little China (1986) starring Kurt Russell.

Music

Score 

Alan Silvestri (Back to the Future) was originally set to provide the film score but turned the project down. Paramount then turned to John Barry, who had just come off his award-winning score for Out of Africa. However, during post-production, Barry also left the project when both differences with the producers and test screening feedback presented considerable challenges for the composer. The test audience reaction had led the producers replacing Barry's score with new music by Michel Colombier that, in contrast to Barry's work, was mostly "synthpop" (although there were some brief orchestral passages throughout). Some of Barry's musical cues remain in the final cut of the film and one track, "Wisdom of the Ages", appeared on the first soundtrack release issued by Capitol Records.

In 2011, La-La Land Records released a limited-edition 3-CD soundtrack set containing the entirety of both Barry's mostly unused score (on disc one), and Colombier's final theatrical score (on disc two), in addition to an exclusive Barry-composed song, sung by emerging composer Randy Edelman. The songs that had been released on Capitol's first soundtrack in 1986 were also featured in the set.

Soundtrack 
The following pieces of music appear in the film alongside Colombier's score:

 Ann Wilson - "The Best Man in the World" (Music by John Barry; lyrics by Ann Wilson, Nancy Wilson and Sue Ennis)
 Ratt - "Body Talk" (Composed by Stephen Pearcy, Warren DeMartini and Juan Croucier)
 "Wisdom of the Ages" (Composed and conducted by John Barry)
 "(Let Your Love Find) The Chosen One" (Performed by Marlon Jackson)
 "The Chosen One" (Composed by Michel Colombier and performed by Robbie Buchanan)
 "Puttin' on the Ritz" (Composed by Irving Berlin)
 "Another Day's Life" (Composed by David Wheatley)

Reception

Box office
Released in December 1986, The Golden Child was a box office success. It earned US$79,817,937 in the United States alone, making it the eighth biggest film of the year. "My pictures make their money back," Murphy remarked in 1989. "No matter how I feel, for instance, about The Golden Child – which was a piece of shit – the movie made more than $100 million. So who am I to say it sucks?"  After The Golden Child, Murphy would participate in the writing of many of his films.

Despite its commercial success, the film did not meet Paramount's expectations when compared to Murphy's previous film, Beverly Hills Cop (1984), which garnered US$234,760,478 at the US box office.

Critical response
On Rotten Tomatoes, the film has an approval rating of 22% based on 23 reviews, with an average rating of 4.2/10. On Metacritic, the film has a score of 37 out of 100, based on reviews from 12 critics, indicating "generally unfavorable reviews". Audiences surveyed by CinemaScore gave the film an average grade of "B" on an A+ to F scale.

Roger Ebert of The Chicago Sun-Times gave the film 3 out of 4 stars and stated "The Golden Child may not be the Eddie Murphy movie we were waiting for, but it will do. It is funnier, more assured and more tailored to Murphy than "Beverly Hills Cop" and it shows a side of his comic persona that I don't think has been much appreciated: his essential underlying sweetness. Murphy's comedy is not based on hurt and aggression, but on affection and an understanding that comes from seeing right through the other characters."  In his Movie Guide, Leonard Maltin stated, "It was a box-office hit, but have you ever met anyone who actually liked it?" Janet Maslin of The New York Times called it a "comedy without laughs".

Writer Dennis Feldman was disappointed with the film and thought they should have taken the script more seriously "but instead, everybody wanted to make an Eddie Murphy comedy" and was critical of director Michael Ritchie "it's not what the director should have done—and he didn't even do it that well, either."
Charles Dance (who played the villain Sardo Numspa) said:

References

External links
 
 

1986 films
1980s action comedy films
1980s fantasy comedy films
American action comedy films
American adventure comedy films
American black comedy films
American fantasy comedy films
1980s English-language films
Demons in film
Films directed by Michael Ritchie
Films shot in California
Films shot in Nepal
Films about Buddhism
Films scored by John Barry (composer)
Films scored by Michel Colombier
Fictional Buddhist monks
1986 comedy films
Paramount Pictures films
Films produced by Edward S. Feldman
1980s American films